Royal Air Force Throwley or more simply RAF Throwley is a former Royal Air Force (RAF) installation located  south of Throwley, Kent and  north of Ashford, Kent. The installation was also used by the Royal Flying Corps was previously called Throwley Aerodrome before being taken over the RAF during April 1918 and renamed to its current name.

History

Land situated between Bells Forstal and Throwley Forstal, including Dodds Willows and the Bells Forstal farmhouse was acquired by the Royal Flying Corps in 1916 for use as a landing ground for home defence squadrons defending London and the Thames Estuary and Kent. From October 1916 50 Squadron RFC detached aircraft to Throwley. In July 1917 newly formed 112 Squadron was based with a variety of biplane fighters including the Sopwith Pup, Sopwith Camel and Sopwith Snipe. In February 1918 143 Squadron was formed at Throwley flying the Armstrong Whitworth F.K.8 but it moved soon after to nearby RAF Detling.

188 Squadron was formed at Throwley on 20 December 1917 as a training unit with the Avro 504K, in June 1918 the squadron provided training for the units flying the Sopwith Camel. In March 1919 188 Squadron RAF was disbanded and in June 1919 112 Squadron RAF was disbanded and the land was returned to agricultural use.

Units and aircraft
 No. 50 Squadron RFC (1916–1918) detachments from Detling Aerodrome
 No. 112 Squadron RFC/RAF (1918–1919) Sopwith Pup, Sopwith Camel and Sopwith Snipe
 No. 142 Squadron RFC (1918) Armstrong Whitworth F.K.8

References

Citations

Bibliography

External links
Reminisces of operations involving Throwley

Royal Air Force stations in Kent
Royal Flying Corps airfields
Royal Flying Corps airfields in Kent
1916 establishments in England
1919 disestablishments in England